Tint Swe is a former Deputy Minister of Construction. 

He was born on 7 November 1936.

References

Government ministers of Myanmar
1936 births
Living people
Union Solidarity and Development Party politicians